Our Time Has Come is an album by Denise Ho, initially released on May 19, 2006, and later re-released on July 19, 2006.

Track listing
花見 (Hanabi) - 3:55
願我可以學會放低你 (I Wish I Knew How to Quit You) - 4:23
我們的 (Ours) (Interlude) - 2:15
滿城盡帶黃金甲 (Fully Belted Gold Armor) - 3:08
Her Story - 3:37
夜半敲門 (Knocking the Door at Midnight) - 4:42
學會了 (Learned) (Reprise) - 1:58
圓滿 (Complete) - 4:18
忘了你是你 (To Forget You are You) (Mandarin) - 4:24
夜半開門 (Opening the Door at Midnight) (Mandarin) - 4:42

DVD
Included with version 1 only:
花見七九八 (Seeing Flowers Seven Nine Eight) (Music Movie) - 33 minutes
Music Movie 製作特輯 (Making Of) - 11 minutes

Included with version 2 only:
Opening (NCM Live)
滿城盡帶黃金甲 (Fully Belted Gold Armor) (NCM Live)
你是八十年代 (You are the 80's) (NCM Live)
Her Story (NCM Live)
沙 (Sand) (NCM Live)
願我可以學會放低你 (I Wish I Knew How to Quit You) (NCM Live)
花見 (Hanabi) (NCM Live)
艷光四射 (Glamorous) (NCM Live)
花迷戀 (Flower Love) (NCM Live)
夜半敲門 (Knocking the Door at Midnight) (NCM Live)
圓滿 (Complete) (NCM Live)
花見 (Hanabi) (Music Video)
願我可以學會放低你 (I Wish I Knew How to Quit You) (Music Video)
夜半敲門 (Knocking the Door at Midnight) (Music Video)
圓滿 (Complete) (Music Video)

Denise Ho albums
2006 albums